Alaguilac were an indigenous Nahua people who lived on the Río Motagua in what is now eastern Guatemala and northern El Salvador. The Alagüilac language is unclassified.

References

External links
 http://www.inforpressca.com/sancristobalaca/

Indigenous peoples in Guatemala